Akash Chourasiya is a multiple award-winning farmer from Sagar District in Madhya Pradesh, India. He is known for innovative farming techniques like organic agriculture and multi-layer agriculture.

Social Link
 
  Akash Chourasiya facebook  Page  
 Akash Chourasiya facebook 
 Akash Chourasiya instagram
 Akash Chourasiya youtube
 Akash Chourasiya youtube Handle
 Akash Chourasiya twitter

Early life 
Akash Chourasiya initially wanted to pursue career in medical and wanted to be a doctor but after completing High school changed direction and started farming on just ten decimal land.

Agricultural work

Organic Farming 
Akash Chourasiya does not use any chemical products in the agriculture. All the manures and pesticides are prepared using natural products. He prepares vermicompost to replace fertilizers using cow dungs and use various techniques to avoid insects in the crops.

Multi-Layer Farming 
Aakash Chourasiya uses concept of multi-layer farming on his land. On one piece of land he grows crops at multiple layers simultaneously, for example Ginger (below grounds), amaranthus (at 1–2 feet above grounds), Ivy gourd (at 6–8 feet above grounds) and Papaya (at 9–10 feet above grounds). This method reduces the cost and leads to higher agriculture output.

Farmer Training 
Aakash Chourasiya has been organising free training to interested farmers 20nd to 26th (7day practical training) and 27th and 28th (2day training) of every month at his farms for years. He has trained thousands of farmers and many of them have their own success stories.

Awards 
Aakash Chourasiya has been awarded by prime minister Narendra Modi. He has got several other national level awards such as Patanjali krishi gaurav award, Jindal foundation Swayam Sidhdha award, Krishithon award, Mahindra smridhdhi krishi yuva (youth farmer), Best farmer award by Bioved institute allahabad.

See also
Subhash Palekar
Shripad Dabholkar
Natural Farming
Organic Farming

References

Living people
Indian farmers
Year of birth missing (living people)